Hugh MacDonald  (1841–1898) was a Roman Catholic clergyman who served as the Bishop of Aberdeen from 1890 to 1898.

Early life
Born in Borrodale on the Isle of Skye on 7 November 1841, he was the second son of Angus MacDonald and Mary MacDonald (née Watson). His younger brother was Angus MacDonald, Archbishop of St. Andrews and Edinburgh. Hugh MacDonald was educated at St Cuthbert's College, Ushaw. On the completion of his studies, he taught there for a year as Professor of Humanities.

Priestly career
Ordained to the priesthood on 21 September 1867, he acted for two or three years as a secular priest in Greenock. Subsequently, joining the Congregation of the Redemptorists, he entered upon his new vocation with great energy, conducting missions all over the world, but proving especially valuable in the Highlands from his thorough acquaintance with the Gaelic language. For several years he acted as rector of the Redemptorist Monastery at Kinnoull, and after holding several other important offices, he was appointed Provincial of the Order.

Episcopal career
He was appointed the Bishop of the Diocese of Aberdeen by the Holy See on 14 August 1890, and consecrated to the Episcopate on 23 October 1890. The principal consecrator was Archbishop William Smith, and the principal co-consecrators were Bishop John McLachlan and Bishop (later Archbishop) Angus MacDonald.

The wisdom of his nomination was manifest from the very outset of his episcopal career in the repair of old, or the erection of new churches, in the enlargement of schools, and in the promotion of the general prosperity and working order of his diocese. He took a great interest in the welfare of the junior seminary of St Mary's College, Blairs, near Aberdeen, and threw himself enthusiastically into the scheme for rebuilding and extending the institution. He erected the Cathedral chapter at Aberdeen, made the canonical visitation with great regularity, and altogether infused a great amount of order into the administration of his diocese. Personally, he was of a most amiable and unassuming disposition, respected by all classes of the community in the North, and held in the highest estimation by his clergy and people.

He died at Greenhill Gardens, Edinburgh, the residence of his brother, Archbishop MacDonald, on 29 May 1898, aged 56.

References

1841 births
1898 deaths
Bishops of Aberdeen
19th-century Roman Catholic bishops in Scotland
Redemptorist bishops
Scottish Roman Catholic bishops